Only Just Begun may refer to:

 "Only Just Begun", a 2007 song by Ingrid Olava
 "Only Just Begun", a 2014 song by Samantha Mumba